Barney's Colorful World was a stage show based on the Barney franchise. The show was first performed in January 2003 and toured until late 2004. In this stage show, Barney & his friends go around the world with the power of imagination. The video of the stage show was taped at the Dodge Theater in Phoenix, Arizona in March 2004, and released in September 2004.

Cast
The following cast members were in the video release of "Colorful World." 
Other actors have been in the show as well, but are not listed.

 Dean Wendt as the voice of Barney
 Patrick Mcalister and Rick Starkweather as Barney's costumed actors
 Julie Johnson as the voice of Baby Bop
 Jennifer Barlean and Matthew N. Myers as Baby Bop's costumed actors
 Patty Wirtz as the voice of BJ
 Dave Kendall and Jerad Harris as BJ's costumed actors

Additional Cast
 Blake Garrett as Mike
 Alex Collins as Donny
 Tory Green as Sarah
 Alexis Acosta as Gina

New Footage (US)
 Daven Wilson as Jackson
 Alyssa Franks as Stacy
 Julia Nicholson as Laura
 Mauri Howell as Mom

Songs

Act One
 "Barney Theme Song" (tune: "Yankee Doodle")
 "If You're Happy and You Know It"
 "Being Together"
 "Mr. Knickerbocker"
 "The Airplane Song"
 "Jungle Adventure"
 "The Elephant Song"
 "If All the Raindrops"
 "The Wheels on the Bus"
 "It's C-C-C-Cold BRRRR!"
 "Look at Me, I'm Dancing"
 "The Rainbow Song"

Act Two
 "I'd Love to Sail"
 "The Baby Bop Hop"
 "Mr. Sun"
 "Bingo"
 "Castles So High"
 "The Duckies Do"
 "If I Lived Under the Sea"
 "Bubbles"
 "Twinkle, Twinkle, Little Star" (tunes: "Baa, Baa, Black Sheep", "The Alphabet Song" and "Ah! vous dirai-je, Maman" by Wolfgang Amadeus Mozart)
 "Just Imagine"
 "Colors All Around"
 "I Love You" (tune: "This Old Man")

See also
 List of Barney & Friends episodes and videos

References

Barney & Friends
2004 films
American direct-to-video films
Mattel Creations films
2000s English-language films